Euthyneura is a taxonomic infraclass of snails and slugs, which includes species exclusively from marine, aquatic and terrestrial gastropod mollusks in the clade Heterobranchia.

Euthyneura are characterised by several autapomorphies, but are named for euthyneury.  They are considered to be the most successful and diverse group of Gastropoda. Within this taxon, the Gastropoda have reached their peak in species richness and ecological diversity. This obvious evolutionary success can probably be attributed to several factors. Marine Opisthobranchia, e.g., have evolved several clades specialised on less used food resources such as sponges or cnidarians. A key innovation in the evolution of Pulmonata was the colonization of freshwater and terrestrial habitats.

Various phylogenetic studies focused on Euthyneura: Dayrat et al. (2001), Dayrat & Tillier (2002) and Grande et al. (2004). Morphological analyses by Dayrat and Tillier (2002) demonstrated the need to explore new datasets in order to critically analyse the phylogeny of this controversial group of gastropods. Klussmann-Kolb et al. (2008) traced an evolutionary scenario regarding colonisation of different habitats based on phylogenetic hypothesis and they showed that traditional classification of Euthyneura needs to be reconsidered.

2010 taxonomy 
Jörger et al. (2010) have redefined major groups within the Heterobranchia and a cladogram showing phylogenic relations of Euthyneura is as follows:

2014 taxonomy 
Cladogram showing phylogenic relations of Euthyneura sensu Wägele et al. (2014):

2016 taxonomy
Kano et al. (2016) proposed a new taxon Ringipleura and classified Ringiculoidea as sister group to Nudipleura:

References
This article incorporates CC-BY-2.0 text from the reference

External links

 
Protostome unranked clades